Choral synagogues were built in Eastern Europe, from Hungary to Russia. These synagogues represented the ideas of Jewish Enlightenment (Haskalah) and made certain reforms to the traditional Jewish customs (minhag). Often, they featured male choruses, conducted sermons in local languages (German, Russian, etc.), enforced order during services, decorated their interior, and placed pews facing eastern wall where the Torah ark was displayed (in traditionalist synagogues the bimah stood in the center of the room). However, the changes did not extend to religious beliefs and customs. Therefore, the differences between choral and traditional synagogues are more aesthetic.

Many of these synagogues were either demolished or confiscated and repurposed for other uses, particularly in the Soviet Union by the Bolsheviks after the October Revolution. During the German occupation in the Second World War, many were demolished by the Nazis or destroyed in battles and bombing raids.

Some of the surviving synagogues were renovated and returned to the local Jewish communities, particularly after the fall of Communism and the collapse of the Soviet Union, while the others are used for other purposes or are in ruins.

Active choral synagogues
 Moscow Choral Synagogue of Moscow
 Grand Choral Synagogue of St. Petersburg
 Great Choral Synagogue of Kyiv
 Brodsky Choral Synagogue of Kyiv
 Kharkiv Choral Synagogue
 Choral Synagogue of Drohobych
 Great Synagogue of Hrodna
 Vilnius Choral Synagogue of Vilnius
 Kaunas Choral Synagogue of Kaunas
 Templul Coral in Bucharest
 Great Choral Synagogue of Odessa
 Golden Rose Synagogue (Dnipropetrovsk)

Defunct choral synagogues
 Great Choral Synagogue of Riga (burned in 1941)
 Great Choral Synagogue of Daugavpils
 Great Choral Synagogue of Šiauliai
 Choral Synagogue in Samara (closed in 1929, being restored)
 Choral Synagogue in Smolensk (occupied by a school)
 Choral Synagogue in Białystok (burned during the liquidation of the Białystok Ghetto)
 Choral Synagogue in Vitebsk (closed in 1929, destroyed during World War II)
 Choral Synagogue in Minsk (occupied by a theater)
 Choral Synagogue in Brest
 Choral Synagogue of Liepāja
 Choral Synagogue in Chișinău
 Choral Synagogue in Tallinn (destroyed during bombing in 1944)

See also
 Choral Synagogue (disambiguation)

References

Lists of synagogues